Agyneta jiriensis is a species of sheet weaver found in Nepal. It was described by Wunderlich in 1983.

References

jiriensis
Invertebrates of Nepal
Spiders of Asia
Spiders described in 1983